The Korycanar Formation is a Late Cretaceous geologic formation in the Czech Republic. Archosauromorph remains diagnostic to the genus level are among the fossils that have been recovered from the formation and also dinosaur remains are among the fossils that have been recovered from the formation, although none have yet been referred to a specific genus.

Paleofauna
 Ponerosteus exogirarum - "Tibia"

See also

 List of dinosaur-bearing rock formations
 List of stratigraphic units with few dinosaur genera

Footnotes

References
 Weishampel, David B.; Dodson, Peter; and Osmólska, Halszka (eds.): The Dinosauria, 2nd, Berkeley: University of California Press. 861 pp. .

Cenomanian Stage